Jackassolantern is the sixth live album released by the Athens, GA based band Widespread Panic. The album was recorded during various Halloween shows that the band has performed. It was released on September 28, 2004 and was the  third of three live releases in 2004 by the band. The album is composed of cover songs that the band has performed. The album was released both on CD and as a limited-edition vinyl record.

The album reached a peak position of #169 on the Billboard 200 chart.

Track listing
 "Sweet Leaf" (Black Sabbath) – 6:51
 "Sympathy for the Devil" (Jagger, Richards) – 5:59
 "Sex Machine" (Brown) – 8:35
 "Hot in Herre" (Nelly) – 8:02
 "Peace Frog/Blue Sunday" (The Doors) – 5:30
 "Slippin' into Darkness" (War) – 10:09
 "The Wind Cries Mary" (Hendrix) – 3:40
 "Ball of Confusion (That's What the World Is Today)" (The Temptations) – 16:48
 "Godzilla" (Blue Öyster Cult) – 5:02

Personnel
Widespread Panic
 John Bell – guitar, vocals
 John Hermann – keyboards, vocals
 George McConnell – guitar, vocals
 Todd Nance – drums, vocals
 Domingo S. Ortiz – percussion
 Dave Schools – bass
 Michael Houser – guitar, vocals

Guest Performers
 Randall Bramblett – saxophone
 The Dirty Dozen Brass Band

Production
 John Keane – producer, mixing
 Billy Field – engineer
 Ken Love – mastering
 Brad Blettenberg – engineer
 Flournoy Holmes – artwork, design, photography
 Ellie MacKnight – package coordinator
 Oade Brothers – assistant
 Chris Rabold – assistant

External links
 Widespread Panic website
 Everyday Companion
 [ All Music entry]

2004 live albums
Widespread Panic live albums
Albums produced by John Keane (record producer)